C. album may refer to:
 Chenopodium album, the white goosefoot, a plant species extensively cultivated and consumed in Northern India as a food crop
 Cylindrocarpon album, a fungal plant pathogen species

See also
 Album (disambiguation)